William Henry Luers (born May 15, 1929) is a retired American career diplomat and museum executive. He is the director of the Iran Project. In addition to a thirty-one-year career in the Foreign Service, Luers has served as a U.S. Navy officer, as  president of the Metropolitan Museum of Art in New York City, and as president of the United Nations Association of the United States of America. Luers is an adjunct professor at the School of International and Public Affairs at Columbia University.

Early life and education 
Luers was born in Springfield, Illinois. He received a B.A. from Hamilton College and an M.A. from Columbia University.

Military and diplomatic career 
Luers served as an officer in the U.S. Navy from 1953 to 1957 before joining the United States Foreign Service. His career in the Foreign Service spanned thirty-one years and included service as U.S. Ambassador to Czechoslovakia (1983–1986), U.S. Ambassador to Venezuela (1978–1982), Deputy Assistant Secretary of State for Europe (1977–1978), and Deputy Assistant Secretary of State for Inter-American Affairs (1975–1977).

Post-diplomatic career and other activities
Luers served for thirteen years as the president of the Metropolitan Museum of Art in New York City before becoming president of the United Nations Association of the United States of America (UNA-USA) in February 1999.

Luers currently serves as director of the Iran Project, "a high-level group that has long supported negotiations with Iran."

In the past, Luers has been a visiting lecturer at the Woodrow Wilson School of Public and International Affairs at Princeton University; the director's visitor at the Institute for Advanced Study (1982–83); visiting lecturer at George Washington University, and visiting lecturer; at the School of Advanced International Studies at Johns Hopkins University. He currently serves as an adjunct professor of international and public affairs at the School of International and Public Affairs, Columbia University.

Luers serves on several nonprofit boards, including the boards of the Rockefeller Brothers Fund, National Museum of Natural History, Trust for Mutual Understanding, and Rubin Museum of Art. He also serves as the American International advisor for the Praemium Imperiale Annual Awards to the Arts. Luers is a member of the Council on Foreign Relations and a fellow of the American Academy of Arts and Sciences and American Academy of Diplomacy.

Personal life
Luers is fluent in Russian, Spanish, and Italian. He is married to Wendy Luers, the founder and president of The Foundation for Civil Society.

References

1929 births
Living people
Columbia University alumni
Hamilton College (New York) alumni
People from Springfield, Illinois
Presidents of the Metropolitan Museum of Art
United States Foreign Service personnel
Ambassadors of the United States to Venezuela
Ambassadors of the United States to Czechoslovakia